Clarissine Church may refer to:

Any church or convent maintained by the order of Poor Clares
Clarissine Church (Bamberg), in Bamberg
Clarissine Church (Bratislava), in Bratislava
Clarissine Church (Brixen), in Brixen
Clarissine Church (Nuremberg), in Nuremberg